St Alban's RC High School (Welsh: Ysgol Uwchradd Catholig Sain Alban) is a  Roman Catholic secondary school in Pontypool, Torfaen, Wales. The school provides education from ages 11-16. The school is situated in Park House, the former home of the Hanbury family in Pontypool Park.

Park House
Built in the late seventeenth century by local ironmaster, Major John Hanbury, the house is in a style popularised by the architect Inigo Jones.

In 1923 the Hanbury family sold the property to the Sisters of the Order of the Holy Ghost. It was initially reopened as a girls' day and boarding school. In 1963, control of the school was passed to the Archdiocese of Cardiff to become St Alban’s RC High School.

In March 2023 - St Albans R.C. High School have opened the doors to its newly refurbished library, thanks to a £1.2 million grant from the Welsh Government.

2008 Estyn report 
According to the Autumn 2008 report by Estyn, the school has a GCSE pass rate of 75% (based on 5 GCSEs, grades A-C) which puts it in equal 17th place in Wales and within the top 10% of secondary schools in Wales. The inspection concluded that: 
St Alban’s Roman Catholic High School is a very successful school with many outstanding features. Its Christian values pervade its work and are important to all members of the school community.

Former students 
 Gareth Maule – Rugby player - Llanelli Scarlets
 Lloyd Burns – Rugby player - Newport Gwent Dragons
 Nick Thomas-Symonds - British Labour Party Politician, barrister and academic - MP for Torfaen, May 2015 – Present
 Kevin Owen - British TV News Anchor - former Senior News Anchor at RT International, Moscow 2006–2022, ex-Sky News, BBC World Service, HTV Wales and West, and BBC Wales.

References

Secondary schools in Torfaen
Catholic secondary schools in the Archdiocese of Cardiff
Educational institutions established in 1924
1924 establishments in Wales
Pontypool